Minnesota whist is a simplified version of whist in which there are no trumps, and the goal of the game is to take 7 of the 13 tricks.  Four-handed whist is played with two teams.  The players of each team sit opposite each other at the table.  One person is elected to keep score.  Typically the scorer's team is labeled as "Us" and the other team labeled as "Them". In this game, the ace is high.  This style of whist is sometimes referred to as Norwegian Whist as it has been passed forward to the Upper Midwest by Norwegian immigrants.

Order of Play

 Everyone cuts the deck and high card is dealer.
 Cards are dealt one at a time starting with the person to the left of the dealer and moving clockwise until all cards are dealt.  Each person should have 13 cards.
 Each person analyzes his/her hand and determines whether to "pass" or "grand".  If a player wants to "grand" (play high), he lays down a nondescript black card; otherwise, he lays a red card.
 After all 4 players have laid down their cards, players flip up their cards in turn, starting with the person just left of the dealer.
 As soon as a black card is flipped up, no one else has to flip their card up.
 If any cards are black (called a "Grand Hand"), the goal is to take as many tricks (at least 7) as possible. 
 If all cards are red (sometimes called a "Nula Hand"), the goal is to take as few tricks (6 or fewer) as possible. 
 Play begins with the person to the right of the person who granded or, if playing low, the person to the left of the dealer.

Taking Tricks

The person who leads lays down a card from his/her hand.  Everyone must follow suit if they can.  If a player cannot, he lays down any other card.  Highest card of the lead suit takes the trick.  Whoever takes the trick leads the next one.  Each team pools their tricks, so only one player from each team needs to collect the winning tricks.  Play continues until all cards are gone.  Dealer moves one to the left.

Scoring

If the goal is to lose tricks, the team gets a point for every trick under 7 total.  If the goal is to win tricks, the team gets a point for every trick over 6 total if the team granded, or 2 points for every trick over 6 total if the opposing team granded.

The game continues until one team reaches a pre-designated point total, typically 13.

Scoring samples

 Us:   Granded, got 10 tricks
 Them:   got 3 tricks
 High game, "Us" makes 4 points (10 - 6)
 Us:   Granded, got 5 tricks
 Them:   got 8 tricks
 High game, "Them" makes 4 points (8 - 6) x 2
 Us:   got 9 tricks
 Them:   got 4 tricks
 Low game, "Them" makes 3 points (7 - 4)

Variations from Whist

 There is no trump suit
 No cards are laid down after the hands are dealt; each player instead has the option to either pass or grand.  If everybody passes, the hand is played as low, like in the main rules.
 If a player grands, then the player to the right of the player who grands leads the first trick.

See also

 Tuppi is a similar game played in Northern Finland.

External links
  Norwegian Whist book

Whist
American card games
Four-player card games